Hemileuca neumoegeni, or Neumoegen's buckmoth, is a species of insect in the family Saturniidae. It is found in North America.

References

Further reading

 
 
 

Hemileucinae
Articles created by Qbugbot
Moths described in 1881